Anna Persson (born February 22, 1986) is a Swedish orienteering competitor and junior world champion.

She became Junior World Champion in the relay in Gdańsk in 2004, together with Elina Skantze and Helena Jansson, and received 
an individual gold medal in the middle distance in Tenero in 2005. She received silver medals in the relay event in 2005 and in 2006.

References

External links
 

1986 births
Living people
Swedish orienteers
Female orienteers
Foot orienteers
Junior World Orienteering Championships medalists